This is a list of ancient Greek theatres by location.

Attica and Athens
Theatre of Dionysus, Athens
Odeon of Athens, Athens
Theatre of Oropos, Oropos, East Attica
Theatre of Zea, Piraeus, Athens
Theatre of Thoricus, East Attica
Theatre of Aegina, Attica
Theatre of Rhamnous, East Attica

Continental Greece and Euboea
Theatre of Chaeronea, Boeotia
Theatre of Orchomenos, Orchomenus (Boeotia)
Theatre of Delphi, Delphi
Theatre of Stratos, Aetolia-Acarnania
Theatre of Oiniades, Aetolia-Acarnania
Theatre of Eretria, Euboea
Theatre of Thebes, Thebes

Thessaly and Epirus
First Ancient Theatre, Larissa
Second Ancient Theatre, Larissa
Theatre of Dodona, Ioannina
Theatre of Ambracia, Arta
Theatre of Omolion, Larissa
Theatre of Demetrias, Volos
Theatre of Cassope, Preveza
Theatre of Gitanae,Thesprotia
Theatre of Apollonia, in Illyria
Theatre of Bouthrotos (modern Butrinti)
Theatre of Byllis

Macedonia and Thrace
Theatre of Dion, Pieria
Theatre of Mieza, Imathia
Theatre of Amphipolis, Serres
Theatre of Abdera, Xanthi
Theatre of Vergina (Aigai), Imathia
Theatre of Olynthus, Chalcidice
Theatre of Philippi, Kavala
Theatre of Maroneia, Rhodope
Theatre of Ohrid, Ohrid

Peloponnese
Theatre of Corinth, Corinthia
Theatre of Argos, Argolis
Theatre of Epidaurus, Epidaurus
Theatre A' of Epidaurus, Argolis
Theatre B' of Epidaurus, Argolis
Theatre of Megalopolis, Arcadia
Theatre of Aigeira, Achaea
Theatre of Elis, Eleia
Theatre of Gytheion, Laconia
Theatre of Isthmia, Corinthia
Theatre of Mantineia, Arcadia
Theatre of Messene (Ithome), Messenia
Theatre of Orchomenos, Arcadia
Theatre of Sicyon, Corinthia
Theatre of Sparta, Laconia

Aegean Islands
Theatre of Delos, Cyclades
Theatre of Milos, Cyclades
Theatre of Rhodes, Dodecanese
Theatre of Mytilene, Lesbos
Theatre of Hephaistia, Lemnos
Theatre of Samothrace
Theatre of Thasos
Theatre of Thera, Cyclades
Odeon of Kos, Dodecanese

Magna Graecia
Theatre of Metapontum, Basilicata

Cyprus
Theatre of Soli, Soli 
Theatre of Salamis, Salamis 
Theatre of Kourion, Kourion 
Odeon Amphitheatre, Paphos

Sicily
Theatre of Catania
Theatre of Segesta
Theatre of Syracuse
Theatre of Taormina
Theatre of Akrai

Asia Minor and Ionia (Turkey)
Theatre of Aigai (Aeolis), Manisa Province
Theatre of Alexandria Troas, Çanakkale Province
Theatre of Antiphellus, Kaş, Antalya Province
Theatre of Aphrodisias, Geyre, Aydın Province
Theatre of Arycanda, Antalya Province
Theatre of Aspendos, Antalya Province
Theatre of Assos, Çanakkale Province
Theatre of Ephesus, İzmir Province
Theatre of Halicarnassus, Bodrum, Muğla Province
Theatre of Hierapolis, Denizli Province
Theatre of Knidos, Datça Peninsula, Muğla Province
Theatre of Cyme (Aeolis), İzmir Province
Theatre of Laodicea, Denizli Province
Theatre of Letoon, Antalya Province
Theatre of Miletus, Aydın Province
Theatre of Myrina, İzmir Province
Theatre of Pergamon, İzmir Province
Theatre of Phocaea, İzmir Province
Theatre of Pinara, Muğla Province
Theatre of Pitane (Aeolis), İzmir Province
Theatre of Priene, Aydın Province
Theatre of Sardis,  Manisa Province
Theatre of  Side, Antalya Province
Theatre of  Termessos,  Antalya Province
Theatre of Telmessus, Fethiye, Muğla Province
Theatre of  Troy, Çanakkale Province

See also
 Odeon
 Ancient Greek architecture
 Theatre of ancient Greece

Ancient Greek theatre
Ancient Greek dramatists and playwrights
Ancient Greece
Theatres